Brian Oge O'Rourke (Irish: Brian Óg na Samhthach Ó Ruairc), c. 1568 - 28 January 1604, was the penultimate king of West Breifne, from 1591 until his overthrow in April 1603, at the end of the Nine Years' War. Due to the successive deaths of both his older brother Eoghan in 1589 and his father Brian O'Rourke, who was executed in London in 1591, Brian Oge was thrust into the leadership of his kingdom at just 23 years old. In 1599, O'Rourke's forces fought alongside those of Hugh Roe O'Donnell at the Battle of Curlew Pass, during the Nine Years' War. His forces, along with those of Hugh O'Neill, 2nd Earl of Tyrone, were still sufficiently menacing to Queen Elizabeth I that she was persuaded to agree to a peace in Ireland - the Treaty of Mellifont.

O'Rourke was the last Irish king to be defeated in the war, roughly a month after the others had surrendered. He never surrendered, but was ousted by his brother Teigue, who had defected to the English during the war and with their support invaded his kingdom in March 1603. He fled to Galway where he died of fever in January 1604.

In accordance with his wishes, O'Rourke was buried in the cloister of the Ross Errilly Friary.  He was succeeded by his brother, Teigue.

References
Annals of the Four Masters at CELT (University College Cork)
Burke, Oliver J. The Abbey of Ross, its History and Details, Dublin, 1869.

1560s births
1604 deaths
16th-century Irish monarchs
17th-century Irish monarchs
Irish lords
People of Elizabethan Ireland
People from County Leitrim
People from County Galway
People of the Nine Years' War (Ireland)